Bettborn is a village in the commune of Préizerdaul, in western Luxembourg.  , the village had a population of 218.  It is the administrative centre of Préizerdaul commune.

Préizerdaul
Villages in Luxembourg